Floh-Seligenthal is a municipality in the district Schmalkalden-Meiningen, in Thuringia, Germany.

Notable people

Born in Floh-Seligenthal
 Johann Michael Bach III, (1745 - 1820) German composer, lawyer and music theorist
 Carola Anding, (* 1960) East German cross-country skier

Notable residents
 Gerhard Grimmer, (* 1943) East German cross-country skier
 Matthias Jacob, (* 1960) East German biathlete
 Frank Luck, (* 1967)German and before 1990 East German biathlete
 René Hoppe, (* 1976) German bobsledder 
 Sven Fischer, (* 1971) German biathlete

Town twinning 
Floh-Seligenthal is twinned with:

  Châteauneuf-en-Thymerais, France
  Körle, Germany

References

Municipalities in Thuringia
Schmalkalden-Meiningen